The 2001 Arab Cup Winners' Cup was the 12th and the last edition of the Arab Cup Winners' Cup held in Tunis, Tunisia between 26 February – 10 March 2002. The teams represented Arab nations from Africa and Asia.
Stade Tunisien from Tunisia won the final against Al-Hilal from Sudan for the second time.

This was the last Arab Cup Winners' Cup; the tournament merges with the Arab Club Champions Cup and the Arab Super Cup to create in 2002 one tournament called Prince Faisal bin Fahd Tournament for Arab Clubs.

Qualifying round
Stade Tunisien (the hosts) and Al-Hilal Riyadh (the holders) qualified automatically.

Group stage

Group A

Group B

Knock-out stage

Semi-finals

Final

Winners

References

External links
Arab Cup Winners' Cup 2001 – rsssf.com

2001
2001 Arab CWC
2001
2001 in Tunisian sport